Acacia poliochroa is a shrub belonging to the genus Acacia and the subgenus Phyllodineae that is endemic to south western Australia. 

It blooms from September to October and produces yellow flowers. The linear, biconvex, blackish seed pods that form after flowering are strongly curved or form a single coil.

It is native to an area in the eastern Wheatbelt and Goldfields-Esperance regions of Western Australia where it is found on flats, undulating plains and ironstone rises growing in clay to sandy loam soils. The bulk of the population is situated between Lake King in the west through to Norseman in the east to Marvel Loch in the north as a part of open heath, mallee scrub and Eucalyptus woodland communities.

See also
List of Acacia species

References

poliochroa
Acacias of Western Australia
Taxa named by Ernst Pritzel
Plants described in 1904